"Romeo and Juliet" is a song by Blue System. It is the first track on their 1992 seventh studio album, Hello America, and was released as its lead single.

The single debuted at number 97 in Germany for the week of March 9, 1992, peaking at number 25 two weeks later.

Composition 
The song is written and produced by Dieter Bohlen.

Charts

References 

1992 songs
1992 singles
Blue System songs
Hansa Records singles
Songs written by Dieter Bohlen
Song recordings produced by Dieter Bohlen